Essaïd Belkalem (born 1 January 1989) is an Algerian professional footballer who plays as a defender for JS Kabylie and the Algeria national team.

Club career
In 2008, Belkalem was promoted to the JS Kabylie senior team from the club's junior ranks.

In the 2009–2010 season, Belkalem made 20 appearances, scoring one goal.

On 18 July 2010, Belkalem scored JS Kabylie's only goal in the win over Egyptian club Ismaily in the group stage of the 2010 CAF Champions League with a header in the 75th minute.

In February 2013, with his contract expiring in June, Belkalem said that he would be leaving JS Kabylie at the end of the season to join a European club.

Granada
In June 2013, with his contract with JS Kabylie expired, it was announced that Belkalem had signed a five-year contract with Spanish La Liga club Granada, joining them on a free transfer.

Watford
Belkalem signed for Championship club Watford on a season-long loan on 12 August 2013.
 He wore the number 5 shirt. He made his debut for Watford in their 2–0 League Cup victory over Bournemouth on 28 August 2013, playing the full 90 minutes. His league debut came in a 1–1 draw at home to Charlton Athletic on 14 September 2013.

Watford exercised the right to make Belkalem's move a permanent one following the expiry of his loan, joining on an undisclosed deal in June 2014.

On 10 August 2016, Belkalem was released from his contract at Watford, after playing 10 times in three years.

Trabzonspor (loan)

After moving to Watford on a permanent basis in the summer of 2014, Belkalem made the move to Turkish Süper Lig side Trabzonspor on a season-long loan deal linking up with former Algeria coach Vahid Halilhodžić. Having made 16 appearances in the league, eight in the Europa League, scoring three goals, Belkalem finalised his loan spell at Trabzonspor on 2 June 2015.

JS Kabylie 
On 15 January 2018, after six months without a contract, Belkalem returned to his former club JS Kabylie.

International career
In 2007, Belkalem was called up to the Algerian U20 national team for the first edition of the Mediterranean Trophy held in Sicily, Italy. In 2008, he  started in a 2009 African Youth Championship qualifier against Mauritania.

In August 2009, Belkalem received his first call-up to the Algeria Under-23 national team for a week-long training camp in Algiers.

In 2010, he was called up to the Algeria A' national team for a qualifier against Libya.

On 12 May 2012, Belkalem was called up for the first time to the Algeria national team for the 2014 FIFA World Cup qualifiers against Mali and Rwanda, and the return leg of the 2013 Africa Cup of Nations qualifier against Gambia. On 9 September, he made his debut for the team as a starter in the first leg of the 2013 Africa Cup of Nations second round qualifier against Libya. Belkalem played the entire match as Algeria went on to win 1–0.

On 31 May 2014, Belkalem played an International Friendly, he scored his first international goal, he scored the first goal of the match between his team Algeria against Armenia and Algeria won the match by score of 3–1.

Belkalem was later included in Algeria's squad for the 2014 FIFA World Cup, helping them to the Round of 16 for the first time ever.

Honours
In 2009, Belkalem was chosen as the third best young talent in the Algerian Championnat National behind Abderahmane Hachoud and Youcef Ghazali in a vote conducted by DZFoot.

References

1989 births
Living people
People from Mekla
Kabyle people
Algerian footballers
Association football defenders
Algeria international footballers
Algeria A' international footballers
Algeria youth international footballers
Algeria under-23 international footballers
2011 African Nations Championship players
2013 Africa Cup of Nations players
2014 FIFA World Cup players
Algerian Ligue Professionnelle 1 players
English Football League players
Süper Lig players
Ligue 2 players
JS Kabylie players
Granada CF footballers
Watford F.C. players
Trabzonspor footballers
US Orléans players
Algerian expatriate footballers
Algerian expatriate sportspeople in Spain
Expatriate footballers in Spain
Algerian expatriate sportspeople in England
Expatriate footballers in England
Algerian expatriate sportspeople in France
Expatriate footballers in France
Algerian expatriate sportspeople in Turkey
Expatriate footballers in Turkey